Périers or Perrières is the name or part of the name of several communes in France:

Périers, Manche, in the Manche département
Périers-en-Auge, in the Calvados département 
Périers-sur-le-Dan, in the Calvados département
Perrières, in the Calvados département